Extinction is the end of a species.

Extinct may also refer to:

Science
 Extinct volcano, one that scientists consider unlikely to erupt again
 Extinct town, an abandoned village, town, or city
 Extinct comet, one that has expelled most of its volatile ice
 Extinct in the wild, conservation status

Media
 Extinct (2001 TV series), a C4 UK series about extinct species
 Extinct (2006 TV series), an ITV UK series about endangered species
 Extinct (2017 TV series), an American post-apocalyptic science-fiction TV series
 Extinct (album), a 2015 album by Moonspell
 Extinct (film), an animated film by David Silverman

Other
 Extinct hereditary titles

See also
 Extinct language
 Extinction (disambiguation)
 Lists of extinct species
 Dormant (disambiguation)
 Extant (disambiguation)